Nigeria competed in the 2010 Commonwealth Games held in Delhi, India, from 3 to 14 October 2010.

Medalists

Medals By Sport

See also
 2010 Commonwealth Games

References

External links
 Times of india

Nations at the 2010 Commonwealth Games
2010
2010 in Nigerian sport